Michael D. Laibson is an American television producer and theatre director who is notable for producing soap operas such as As the World Turns (1986–1988), Another World (AW) (1988–1993), All My Children (Senior Producer) and Guiding Light (1995–1996).

He earned a B.A. from UCLA, and taught for the Saratoga Arts Festival.

He turned down an offer by Procter & Gamble Productions to be the Executive Producer of Guiding Light in 2004.

Writing career
He was a writer on AW during the 1988 Writers Guild of America strike. The stories were written by Donna Swajeski (then head writer) and Harding Lemay.

He now teaches a soap opera writing class for the New York Film Academy's screenwriting program.

Awards/Nominations
He's garnered 4 Daytime Emmy Awards nominations and 1 win.

External links

Soap opera producers
Year of birth missing (living people)
University of California, Los Angeles alumni
Living people
American soap opera writers
New York Film Academy